Pestel is a commune in the Corail Arrondissement, in the Grand'Anse department of Haiti. It has 36,138 inhabitants. The commune also includes the Cayemite Islands.

Locations in Pestèl

Mainland: Bourjoly, Fond Gondai, Jean Bellune, Joly Guirbert, La Salle, La Source, Lere de L'Eau, Nan Dane, Nan Palmiste, Paviton, Pestèl and Plane Martin, Glode.

Grande Cayemite: Anse a Macon, Anse du Nord, Au Bord de l'Etang, Mare Citron, Nan Palmis and Pointe Sable.

References

Populated places in Grand'Anse (department)
Communes of Haiti